Twrcelyn was a rural district in the administrative county of Anglesey, Wales, from 1894 to 1974. The district took its name from Twrcelyn, one of the ancient cwmwds or medieval subdivisions of the island.

The district was formed by the Local Government Act 1894 as successor to the Anglesey Rural Sanitary District. The district consisted of the following civil parishes:

The rural district was abolished in 1974, when the Local Government Act 1972 amalgamated Twrcelyn with the other local authorities on the island to become the district of Ynys Môn - Isle of Anglesey.

External links

Twrcelyn Rural District Council records'' (Archives Network Wales), accessed January 23, 2008

Rural districts of Wales
History of Anglesey
1894 establishments in Wales